Achaea indicabilis is a species of moth of the family Erebidae first described by Francis Walker in 1858. It is found in Africa, including São Tomé, Ghana and the Gold Coast.

The larvae feed on Citrus species.

References

Achaea (moth)
Erebid moths of Africa
Lepidoptera of West Africa
Moths described in 1858